Streptomyces brevispora is a bacterium species from the genus Streptomyces which has been isolated from soil from the Cockle Park Experimental Farm in Northumberland in the United Kingdom.

See also 
 List of Streptomyces species

References

Further reading

External links
Type strain of Streptomyces brevispora at BacDive -  the Bacterial Diversity Metadatabase

brevispora
Bacteria described in 2012